Diethylstilbestrol dilaurate (brand name Acnestrol-Lotion) is a synthetic, nonsteroidal estrogen of the stilbestrol group and an ester of diethylstilbestrol (DES) that was previously marketed but is now no longer available. It was formulated and used as a micronized topical medication to treat acne in adolescent boys and young men. The drug was marketed as early as 1951.

References

Estrogen esters
Laurate esters
Phenols
Synthetic estrogens